In enzymology, a 2-hydroxymethylglutarate dehydrogenase is an enzyme that catalyzes the chemical reaction

(S)-2-hydroxymethylglutarate + NAD+  2-formylglutarate + NADH + H+

Thus, the two substrates of this enzyme are (S)-2-hydroxymethylglutarate and NAD+, whereas its 3 products are 2-formylglutarate, NADH, and H+.

This enzyme belongs to the family of oxidoreductases, specifically those acting on the CH-OH group of donor with NAD+ or NADP+ as acceptor. The systematic name of this enzyme class is (S)-2-hydroxymethylglutarate:NAD+ oxidoreductase. This enzyme is also called HgD.

References

 

EC 1.1.1
NADH-dependent enzymes
Enzymes of unknown structure